Ælfstan is an Anglo-Saxon given name borne by several men

 Ælfstan (bishop of London) (died 995), Bishop of London
 Ælfstan (bishop of Rochester) (died 995), Bishop of Rochester
 Ælfstan (bishop of Ramsbury) (died 981), Bishop of Ramsbury

Old English given names